We at Väddö (Swedish: Vi på Väddö) is a 1958 Swedish drama film directed by Arthur Spjuth and starring Ann-Marie Gyllenspetz, Bengt Brunskog and Karl-Arne Holmsten. It was shot at the Centrumateljéerna Studios in Stockholm. The film's sets were designed by the art director Bibi Lindström.

Cast
 Ann-Marie Gyllenspetz as Ylva Markner
 Bengt Brunskog as 	Frans Sundberg
 Karl-Arne Holmsten as 	Bengt Wollinder
 Ittla Frodi as 	Olivia Nilsson
 John Elfström as Eiland Johnsson
 Erik Strandmark as 	Ströms-Janne
 Nils Hallberg as 	Conny Nelson
 Rut Holm as 	Agda Mattsson
 Keve Hjelm as 	Daniel Sundberg
 Inga Landgré as 	Berit Sundberg
 Axel Högel as 	Östen Larsson
 Einar Axelsson as Blom
 Arthur Fischer as	Shop Keeper Pettersson 
 Siegfried Fischer as Leonard Larsson 
 Stig Johanson as 	Janitor 
 Ludde Juberg as 	Efraim 
 Birger Lensander as 	Fisherman 
 Ingemar Pallin as 	José Strömberg 
 Bellan Roos as 	Mrs. Pettersson 
 Birger Åsander as 	Fisherman

References

Bibliography 
 Qvist, Per Olov & von Bagh, Peter. Guide to the Cinema of Sweden and Finland. Greenwood Publishing Group, 2000.

External links 
 

1958 films
Swedish drama films
1958 drama films
1950s Swedish-language films
Films directed by Arthur Spjuth
1950s Swedish films